Streptostachys is a genus of South American plants in the grass family.

 Species
 Streptostachys asperifolia Desv. - Brazil (Bahia, Amapá, Amazonas, Ceará, Maranhão, Pará, Paraíba, Pernambuco, Tocantins, Rio Grande do Norte, Piauí), Fr Guinea, Trinidad & Tobago, Suriname, Bolivia (Santa Cruz), Guyana, Venezuela (Anzoátegui, Bolívar, Sucre, Monagas, Miranda)
 Streptostachys lanciflora R.P.Oliveira & Longhi-Wagner - Bahia
 Streptostachys macrantha (Trin.) Zuloaga & Soderstr. - Brazil (Goiás, D.F., Minas Gerais), Paraguay (Amambay)
 Streptostachys ramosa Zuloaga & Soderstr. -  Brazil (Bahía, Goiás, Mato Grosso, Minas Gerais) 
 Streptostachys rigidifolia Filg. - Maranhão
 Streptostachys robusta Renvoize - Bahia

 formerly included
see Rupichloa 
 Streptostachys acuminata - Rupichloa acuminata

References

Panicoideae
Poaceae genera